Britnee N. Timberlake (born May 14, 1986) is an American Democratic Party politician who has represented the 34th Legislative District in the New Jersey General Assembly since January 29, 2018, when she was sworn in to replace Sheila Oliver, who took office as Lieutenant Governor of New Jersey. Timberlake had served as Freeholder President of the Essex County Board of Chosen Freeholders, where she was at the time the state's only African-American woman to serve as a freeholder board leader.

Early life and education 
A resident of East Orange, New Jersey, Timberlake attended Seton Hall University, where she earned a bachelor's degree in political science and a master's degree in public administration.

Early political career 
She was elected to represent District 3 of the Essex County Board of Chosen Freeholders in 2014 and was selected as the board's president (succeeding Blonnie Watson) at the board's annual reorganization meeting in January 2015. She took office as the county's youngest freeholder under its current system of representation and when chosen as freeholder president became the state's only African American woman to be the head of a freeholder board. She founded and serves as the executive director the Essex Community Land Trust, a not-for-profit organization that works to provide affordable housing in Essex County.

New Jersey General Assembly 
Sheila Oliver, who had run for both Assembly and as Phil Murphy's running mate as Lieutenant Governor of New Jersey in the November 2017 general election, won both seats but was prohibited from serving in both simultaneously; her running for both seats provided Oliver with a backup in case she lost her race with Murphy and would allow the Democratic county members to choose a successor if she won both seats. After taking office in the Assembly on January 9, 2018, she resigned from her seat that same day. On January 29, Timberlake, who had been the only African American woman in the state serving as freeholder director, was sworn in to replace Oliver, a fellow resident of East Orange who had been the first African American woman to serve as speaker of the General Assembly and the first to be elected to a position covering the entire state.

Committees 
Committee assignments for the current session are:
Commerce and Economic Development, Chair
Homeland Security and State Preparedness, Vice-Chair
Joint Committee on Housing Affordability

District 34 
Each of the 40 districts in the New Jersey Legislature has one representative in the New Jersey Senate and two members in the New Jersey General Assembly. The representatives from the 34th District for the 2022—23 Legislative Session are:
 Senator Nia Gill  (D)
 Assemblyman Thomas P. Giblin  (D)
 Assemblywoman Britnee Timberlake  (D)

References

External links
Legislative webpage

1986 births
Living people
African-American state legislators in New Jersey
African-American women in politics
County commissioners in New Jersey
Democratic Party members of the New Jersey General Assembly
Politicians from East Orange, New Jersey
Seton Hall University alumni
Women state legislators in New Jersey
21st-century American politicians
21st-century American women politicians
21st-century African-American women
21st-century African-American politicians
20th-century African-American people
20th-century African-American women